The Temple of Minerva Chalcidica or Minervium was a small temple in the Campus Martius in ancient Rome, dedicated to Minerva. It was built by Pompey the Great in around 60 BC (next to the later site of the Temple of Isis and Serapis) and probably destroyed in the fire of 80 AD which destroyed the Campus Martius. It was then rebuilt by Domitian. 

Its name survives in that of the 8th century basilica of Santa Maria sopra Minerva, then thought to have been built directly atop the temple ruins; it is now known that the temple was 200 metres west of the church's current location, under the church of Santa Marta.

See also
List of Ancient Roman temples

External links
LacusCurtius • Minerva Chalcidica (Platner & Ashby, 1929)

Minerva
60s BC establishments
Temples of Minerva
Destroyed temples